The Desolation Lava Field is a volcanic field associated with the Mount Edziza volcanic complex in British Columbia, Canada. Eve Cone, in the middle of the field, is one of the most symmetrical and best preserved cinder cones in Canada.

Volcanoes
The volcanoes within the field include:

Eve Cone
Moraine Cone
Sidas Cone
Sleet Cone
Storm Cone
Triplex Cone
Twin Cone
Williams Cone

See also
List of volcanoes in Canada
List of Northern Cordilleran volcanoes
Northern Cordilleran Volcanic Province
Volcanic history of the Northern Cordilleran Volcanic Province
Snowshoe Lava Field
Mess Lake Lava Field
Mount Edziza
Volcanism of Canada
Volcanism of Western Canada

References 

Mount Edziza volcanic complex
Volcanism of British Columbia
Volcanic fields of Canada
Cinder cones of Canada
Holocene volcanism
Lava fields